The 1993 WFA Cup Final was the 23rd final of the Women's FA Cup, England's primary cup competition for women's football teams. The showpiece event was the last to be played under the auspices of the Women's Football Association (WFA) prior to their takeover by the Football Association (FA). 

The final was contested between Arsenal and Doncaster Belles on 24 April 1993 at the Manor Ground in Oxford, with highlights broadcast the following day on Channel 4. Arsenal won 3–0 in front of a crowd of 3,547 to clinch their first WFA Cup.

Match

Summary
In the first 20 minutes of the match, Gail Borman broke through Arsenal's defence on four separate occasions, but was repeatedly denied by Lesley Shipp in the Arsenal goal. Just before half-time the game swung decisively in Arsenal's favour. First Michelle Curley scored direct from a corner. Then Gillian Coultard was carried off with an injured shoulder following a collision with Debbie Bampton. Naz Ball quickly made it 2–0 by heading in Curley's cross to collect her 38th goal of the season and maintain her record of scoring in every round of the competition.

With 12 minutes remaining Paul Edmunds sent his wife Sheila Edmunds on as a substitute. But two minutes later Debbie Bampton headed Naz Ball's lob past Tracey Davidson to make the score 3–0 and secure the win for Arsenal. At full-time The FA chief executive Graham Kelly presented the trophy, remarking: "Doncaster lost because they didn't have the finishing touch". Arsenal goalkeeper Lesley Shipp was named Player of the Match.

Details

References

External links
 
 Report at WomensFACup.co.uk

Cup
Women's FA Cup finals
WFA Cup Final
WFA Cup Final, 1993
1993